Korman or Kormann is surname derived either from German korn ("grainseller") or, more likely, from a toponym, perhaps modern-day Karma in Belarus. Karma once had a large Jewish population, and today the name is common among Jews. It may refer to:

People with the surname
 Bart Korman (born 1975), American businessman and politician from Missouri
 Edward R. Korman (born 1942), United States district judge
 Gordon Korman (born 1963), Canadian American author
 Harvey Korman (1927–2008), American comedian
 Jeffrey R. Korman (born 1947), New York politician
 Lindsay Korman, birth name of Lindsay Hartley (born 1978), American singer and actress
 Manuela Kormann (born 1976), Swiss curler
 Maxime Carlot Korman (born 1942), politician from Vanuatu
 Peter Kormann (born 1955), American gymnast

Other
 Korman Stadium, a Vanuatu football stadium
 Korman, Kragujevac, a village near Kragujevac, Serbia
 Korman (Aleksinac), a village near Aleksinac, Serbia
 Korman (Šabac), a village near Šabac, Serbia

See also
 Corman (disambiguation)
 Çorman (disambiguation)

Mačva District